Mulberry Creek is an intermittent stream about  long, formed as a shallow draw on the high plains of the Llano Estacado in Armstrong County, Texas, and flowing southeastward to join the Prairie Dog Town Fork Red River in Hall County, Texas.

Geography
The upland portion of Mulberry Creek is an ephemeral draw that flows only during heavy rainstorms with significant runoff.  Mulberry Creek initially runs southeastward across Armstrong County and drops off the Caprock just south of Claude, Texas. The stream then continues in a southeasterly direction across sparsely populated ranch country of eastern Armstrong and western Hall counties before merging with the Prairie Dog Town Fork Red River.

Overall, Mulberry Creek descends  from its headwaters to its confluence with the Prairie Dog Town Fork, passing through flat to moderately steep terrain along its course.

See also
Salt Fork Red River
Palo Duro Canyon
Little Red River (Texas)
Pease River
Double Mountain Fork Brazos River
Quitaque Creek
List of rivers of Texas

References

External links

Rivers of Texas
Tributaries of the Red River of the South
Rivers of Hall County, Texas